Beecroft Art Gallery is a gallery in Southend-on-Sea, Essex, England. Prior to 2014, the gallery was formerly located in and Edwardian building on Station Road at Westcliff-on-Sea which was donated to the people of Southend-on-Sea in 1952 by Walter Beecroft (1885–1961) to house his eclectic collection of art works. Beecroft was a solicitor in nearby Leigh. He had already set up an Art Gallery Sub-Committee of the Public Libraries & Museum Committee in 1928, and in 1947 he proposed to endow a building to become and Art Gallery. Eventually, this led to the Beecroft Art Gallery on Station Road. Beecroft also endowed the Beecroft Bequest, an art purchase fund administered by the Museums Association. The gallery was resited in 2014 to the former home of the Central Library on Victoria Avenue, Southend-on-Sea.

Art collections
Beecroft Art Gallery has a permanent collection of over 2,000 works, ranging from 17th-century Dutch paintings to contemporary works. The collection includes examples by artists such as Molenaer, Ruisdael and Berchem plus 19th-century artists including Rossetti, Constable and Edward Lear. There are works by Carel Weight, the Great Bardfield Group, and a fine bronze by Jacob Epstein. The local artist Alan Sorrell is represented by his Drawings of Nubia series depicting a visit to Egypt prior to the building of the Aswan Dam. The Thorpe Smith Collection of local landscape views contains paintings, drawings and prints from as early as 1803.

Local views and seascapes include: Afternoon, Hadleigh by George Shalders; At Leigh, Essex by Gustav de Breanski (c.1880–1890); Boats at Leigh by Sheila Appleton (1982); Chalkwell Bay from Belton Hills, Leigh by H. G. Allnutt; Cliff Parade, Leigh on Sea by Arthur H. Taylor; Crowstone Beach by Alfred Harvey Moore; Evening oyster boat off Southend Pier by William Calcott Knell (1867); and Leigh, Essex by Charles Fisher (1878).

Fashion and textiles collection
Southend Museums Service has been acquiring historical fashion as part of its social history collection since opening in the 1970s. The collections have subsequently been re-housed at the Beecroft Art Gallery and fashion exhibitions take place there once a year.

The collections' main strengths are the decades from the 1920s to the 1970s but there are important earlier pieces, most notably a rare, 17th century slap sole shoe. Not surprisingly, beach wear is a major area of collection: in 2009 Southend received a donation of 500 bathing suits from private collector, Mavis Plume. They date from around 1900 to the 1980s and include several rare pieces.

Bathing suits include a 1920s men's suit in pure silk, manufactured in Brighton, a 1930s ladies homemade knitted bathing suit, and an all-in-one navy cotton suit with cream piping, dating to c.1900.

Womenswear includes an apple green silk pelisse robe worn by Sarah Wiseman of Paglesham, Essex at her wedding in 1813, a green corduroy coat of the 1930s, and a 1950s yellow cotton summer dress with black and white pattern and black velvet bows.

Exhibitions
A selection of paintings from the collection is always on display. Highlights include Constable's "On the Stour" and Henry Bright's "Hadleigh Castle". There is a year-round programme of temporary exhibitions including the prestigious Essex Open Exhibition, which runs July–September annually. There are also regular displays of historic costume from the museum collection. Themes explored in the past include wedding costume, beachwear, and evening dress as well as various decades.

In 2012, the Gallery hosted an exhibition of 19th Century prints of the town and surrounding area, complemented by modern photographs of the same locations. The 'A Time and A Place' exhibition featured views of local landmarks such as Cliff Gardens, The Seafront, The Pier and Hadleigh Castle, all donated to the Gallery by a local resident.

Additional photographs

Further reading 

 Beecroft Art Gallery, 1969, Catalogue of the permanent collections in the Beecroft Art Gallery, Southend-on-Sea: Southend-on-Sea Libraries, Art Gallery & Museum Committee, ISBN 0900690046
 Clare Hunt, Highlights from the Beecroft Art Gallery : a selected catalogue of works shown in the Millennium Exhibition May–June 2000, Southend-on-Sea : Southend-on Sea Borough Council, ISBN 9780900690525

External links
 
Art UK

References

Buildings and structures in Southend-on-Sea
Art museums and galleries in Essex
1952 establishments in England